Bahutali  is a village and a gram panchayat in the Suti I CD block in the Jangipur subdivision of Murshidabad district in the state of West Bengal, India.

Geography

Demographics
According to the 2011 Census of India, Bahutali had a total population of 15,963, of which 8,123 (51%) were males and 7,840 (49%) were females. Population in the age range 0-6 years was 3,388. The total number of literate persons in Bahutali was 6,021 (47.88% of the population over 6 years).

Economy
The only bank in this area is a branch of Bank of India.
BANK OF INDIA ATM
INDIAN ATM

Education
Schools
 Bahutali High School(H.S), Bahutali, Suti I.
Bahutali primary school(suti 1),Bahutali, Murshidabad

Bahutali girls jr.high school, Bahutali, Murshidabad

Bahutali snehalata Ghosh primary school, Bahutali, Murshidabad
BAISNABDANGA HATHATPARA S.S.K.
BAISNABDANGA MADRASHA

Health
Bahutali (PHC code. FC0767) Primary Health Centre under suti I block.
Bahutali SC

References

Villages in Murshidabad district